J. J. Kelly High School was a former public high school in Wise, Virginia. The school was opened in 1953. It was part of the Wise County Public Schools system. It was named after a former county school board superintendent, Dr. J. J. Kelly, Jr.  The enrollment in 2005 was 504 students and employed 41 teachers. The mascot for J. J. Kelly High School was the Indian. The school's colors were red and white.  The Indians competed in the Virginia High School League's Single A Lonesome Pine District with five other schools from around Southwest Virginia.  J. J. Kelly High School was merged with Pound High School in 2011 to form Central High School, which is now located in a new facility outside of Wise.

Athletics

State Championships (won) 
Baseball - 1981, 1982, 1983, 1984, 1988, 1989, 1991, 1998, 2008
Basketball (Girls) - 2002
Cross County (Boys) - 1988
Football - 1981
Golf - 2003
Tennis (Girls) - 1986, 1991, 1992, 1993, 1994, 1995, 1996, 1997
Theatre - 2007
Wrestling - 1983, 1988

Records
J. J. Kelly still holds the Virginia High School League record for most state championships won by any school in baseball and girls tennis.  The girls tennis program also holds the record for most consecutive state titles, having won seven, and consecutive team matches won, with a record of 128–0. The state record for most consecutive baseball championships is also held by the Indians, as they won four from 1981 to 1984.

Notable alumni
Carroll Dale - Former Green Bay Packers receiver and a Virginia Sports Hall of Fame inductee

References 

Public high schools in Virginia
Schools in Wise County, Virginia
Educational institutions established in 1953
Wise, Virginia
Schools accredited by the Southern Association of Colleges and Schools
1953 establishments in Virginia
Educational institutions disestablished in 2011
2011 disestablishments in Virginia